War-weariness is the public or political disapproval for the continuation of a prolonged conflict or war. The causes normally involve the intensity of casualties—financial, civilian, and military. It also occurs when a belligerent has the ability to leave the conflict easily but continues to stay. War-weariness normally leads to a distrust in government or military leadership and can spark protest and anti-war movements. It can also be fueled when a belligerent is found guilty of war crimes, which can create domestic and international backlash. Rates of enlistment and the morale of the armed-forces are often affected by war-weariness.

War-weariness is less likely to appear in military dictatorships, especially those with heavy propaganda and censorship. According to Immanuel Kant, democratic nations have a better chance of having unpopular news of the war reach the masses, which increases their chance and level of war-weariness.

Historical examples 
 Cold War
 Anti-Vietnam War Movement
 War on Terror
 Opposition to the Iraq War

References

Anti-war movement
Crowd psychology
Non-interventionism
Peace
Psychological warfare
Warfare

de:Kriegsmüdigkeit